Andrew Keith Jack (also known as Keith Jack) (9 September 1885 – 26 September 1966) was an Australian physicist who served as a member of the Ross Sea Party as part of Ernest Shackleton's Imperial Trans-Antarctic Expedition.

Keith Jack was educated at the University of Melbourne, graduating with an MSc in 1914. A year later he joined the Shackleton expedition, where along with other members of the crew, he became stranded for 2 years in Antarctic after the loss of the ship Aurora. During this time he kept a regular diary across five volumes. Keith was rescued along with six other survivors in 1917.  Keith also took many photographs during the expedition, some of which were later hand-coloured as lantern slides. Keith's diaries, as well as a number of his artefacts from the expedition, including his 1829 Aneroid barometer and a set of  two thermometers, were bequeathed to the Museum Victoria.

After the expedition, Keith worked during the war in an explosives factory (known as the Cordite Factory), utilising his expertise in chemistry, eventually become a Senior Assistant Manager. After the war he took on various roles managing explosives and safety for the Australian Government.

References

1885 births
1966 deaths
Australian physicists
University of Melbourne alumni
Antarctic expeditions